Antoinette Corisande Élisabeth, Duchess of Clermont-Tonnerre (née de Gramont; 23 April 1875 – 6 December 1954) was a French writer of the early 20th century, best known for her long-term lesbian relationship with Natalie Clifford Barney, an American writer. Élisabeth de Gramont had grown up among the highest aristocracy; when she was a child, according to Janet Flanner, "peasants on her farm... begged her not to clean her shoes before entering their houses". She looked back on this lost world of wealth and privilege with little regret, and became known as the "red duchess" for her support of socialism and feminism.

She was a close friend, and sometimes critic of writer Marcel Proust, whom she first met in 1903.

Early life 
Antonia Corisande Élisabeth de Gramont was born on 23 April 1875 in Nancy, France. Called "Lily", she was the daughter of Agénor, 11th duc de Gramont, and his wife, née Princesse Isabelle de Beauvau-Craon. Her mother died giving birth to her. Her father soon married again to the wealthy Marguerite de Rothschild.

Gramont was educated for her class and married Philibert, duc de Clermont-Tonnerre. They had two daughters together.

Natalie Barney 
American writer Natalie Barney and Duchess de Clermont-Tonnerre first met in the spring of 1909; they became lovers on 1 May 1910, a date that they celebrated as their anniversary. Although neither was faithful to the other sexually, they were devoted to one another for their entire lives. Elisabeth's husband is said to have been violent and tyrannical.

The Duchess accepted Barney's ways—perhaps reluctantly at first—and went out of her way to be gracious to Barney's other lovers. For example, the Duchess always included Romaine Brooks when she invited Barney to vacation in the country. Brooks and Barney developed a strong relationship about 1916, and both de Gramont and Brooks had to live with Barney's infidelity. But the three women eventually formed a kind of trio and were devoted to one another for the rest of their lives.

On 20 June 1918 Barney and De Gramont filed an "unofficial" but, at least to them, binding "marriage contract". The contract stated, in part;
"After nine years of life together, joys and worries shared, and affairs confessed. For the survival of the bond that we believe-and wish to believe-is unbreakable, since at its lowest level of reciprocal emotionalism that is the conclusion reached. The union, sorely tried by the passing years, failed doubly the faithfulness test in its sixth year, showing us that adultery is inevitable in these relationships where there is no prejudice, no religion other than feelings, no laws other than desire, incapable of vain sacrifices that seem to be the negation of life..."

In essence, the contract was to bind them together, at least in their own minds, but did not require them to being only with one another sexually. The contract was honored by both until the Duchess' death in 1954.

De Gramont was divorced from Philibert in 1920. She participated in Popular Front parades, and supported politicians of the left. She died in Paris and is buried at Ancy-le-Franc, near the family castle of Clermont-Tonnerre.

Bibliography
 Almanach des bonnes chances de France, 1930
 Le Diable chez la marquise, Littéraires, ca; 1938
 Autour de Saint-James, Du Pavois (publishers), 1945
 Barbey d'Aurevilly, Grasset, 1946
 La Famille des Clermont-Tonnerre, Fasquelle, 1950	
 La Femme et la robe, La Palatine, Paris, Geneva, 1952
 Le Comte d'Orsay et Lady Blessington, 1955	
 Marcel Proust, Flammarion, 1948
 Mémoires d'Élisabeth de Gramont, Grasset, 1929
 Souvenirs du monde de 1890 à 1940

References

Sources

External links 
Painting of Elisabeth de Gramont by Romaine Brookes
Through the years
http://www.marcelproust.it/gallery/gramont.htm#

1875 births
1954 deaths
20th-century French writers
French memoirists
French bisexual writers
French LGBT writers
Bisexual women
LGBT Roman Catholics
French women memoirists
20th-century French women writers
Writers from Nancy, France
French socialists
French feminists
French socialist feminists
Catholic socialists